Cyperus semitrifidus is a species of sedge that is native to southern parts of Africa.

See also 
 List of Cyperus species

References 

semitrifidus
Plants described in 1832
Flora of Angola
Flora of Botswana
Flora of South Africa
Flora of Malawi
Flora of Mozambique
Flora of Tanzania
Flora of Zambia
Flora of Zimbabwe
Taxa named by Heinrich Schrader